The following is a list of notable events and developments that are related to Philippine sports in 2013.

Events

Basketball

Amateur

Professional
 May 19 – the Alaska Aces defeat the Barangay Ginebra San Miguel by sweeping the series, 3–0, with Alaska winning its first championship (13th overall) after Tim Cone's tenure with the Aces. to win the 2013 PBA Commissioner's Cup Championship.
 October 25: The San Mig Coffee Mixers were crowned as the champions of the 2013 PBA Governors' Cup Finals after beating Petron Blaze Boosters in the Game 7 of the finals series, 87–77. Marc Pingris was crowned as the Finals MVP

Collegiate

Women's basketball

National teams
 August 1–11: The 2013 FIBA Asia Championship was hosted by the Philippines from August 1–11, 2013 and held at the Mall of Asia Arena in Pasay.

Baseball

Boxing

Collegiate sports

Cycling

Football

Golf

Mixed martial arts

Multi-sporting events

Tennis

Volleyball
 March 6 – La Salle defeated Ateneo in three sets, 25–23, 25–20, 25–16, to finish the series in two games and win their eighth UAAP women's volleyball championship title. Michele Gumabao was named the Most Valuable Player (MVP) of the Finals.
 July 7 – The inaugural tournament of the Philippine Super Liga were held at the Filoil Flying V Arena in San Juan.

Beach volleyball

Other events

Deaths
January 7: Gonzalo G. Puyat II, 79, former president of FIBA
 August 12: Karyn Cecilia Velez, 24, badminton sensation, road accident
 August 21: Rodolfo Tan Cardoso, 75, Filipino chess player, heart attack

See also
2013 in the Philippines
2013 in sports

References

Philippine sport by year